Pemagatshel is one of the 20 districts of Bhutan.

Language
Native speak Tshangla (Sharchopkha), an East Bodish language that is the lingua franca of eastern Bhutan.

Population
The Pemagatshel district, as of 2005, had a population of 13,864. In February 2011, some 42 households in remote areas of Pemagatshel were slated for relocation closer to population centers in order to provide better access to resources, both natural and governmental. Proponents for this move cited Gross National Happiness as a reason to improve living standards through relocation. This model, if successful, would be replicated in Haa and Lhuentse Districts.

Dzongkhag Profile
Pemagatshel is located in the south east of Bhutan with an area of 517.8 km2 and has a total of 2,547 households. The dzongkhag is characterized by highly dissected mountain ranges, steep slopes and narrow valleys with little flat land. The elevation in the dzongkhag ranges from 1,000 meters to 3,500 meters above the sea level. The dzongkhag experiences an average annual rainfall of 1500 mm to 3000 mm.

The dzongkhag is administratively divided into eleven gewogs. Rugged terrain and scattered settlements make the delivery of services in the dzongkhag both difficult as well as expensive.

About 53% of the total area is under forest cover, mainly coniferous and broadleaf species. With about 45% of the total land area under cultivation, the dzongkhag has a good percentage of arable land. Land holdings are, however, dominated by Tseri cultivation with only negligible wetland farming activities. Dry land cultivation is also a dominant agricultural practice with maize
grown as the main cereal crop.

The potential for the development of horticulture crops like cardamom, ginger and oranges exist in some gewogs like Khar, Dungme and Chongshing Borang but is constrained by the lack of access to roads and markets. Other problems faced by most farmers include the lack of water sources for irrigation and extensive wildlife crop depredation.

In 2001, education was provided to 3740 students by a total of 16 schools ranging from primary to middle secondary schools while health services were delivered by a dzongkhag general hospital, four basic health units and 22 outreach clinics. A total of 88 rural water supply schemes provide piped drinking water facility. Agriculture and livestock extension services are provided by six RNR extension centers, two agriculture extension centers, two Livestock Extension center and a one fodder seed production center.

Inadequate power supply, limited road accessibility and market outlets constitute major challenges to development in the dzongkhag. Off-farm employment in gypsum mines; roads and other construction works constitute an important source of income for the people. The commissioning of Kurichu Power Project and the provision of adequate electricity supply can go a long way in accelerating economic and social development activities in the dzongkhag.

Administrative divisions
Pemagatshel District is divided into eleven village blocks (or gewogs):

Chhimung Gewog
Choekhorling Gewog
Chongshing Borang Gewog
Dechenling Gewog
Dungmaed Gewog
Khar Gewog
Nanong Gewog
Norbugang Gewog
Shumar Gewog
Yurung Gewog
Zobel Gewog

Geography
Southwestern Pemagatshel (the gewog of Norbugang) contains part of Royal Manas National Park.

See also
Districts of Bhutan
Gypsum, Bhutan
Kherigonpa
Kurmaed Province
Khothakpa
Mongling
Nangkhor

References

 
Districts of Bhutan